The second cabinet of Ion I. C. Brătianu was the government of Romania from 4 March 1909 to 28 December 1910.

Ministers
The ministers of the cabinet were as follows:

President of the Council of Ministers:
Ion I. C. Brătianu (4 March 1909 - 28 December 1910)
Minister of the Interior: 
Ion I.C. Brătianu (4 March - 15 December 1909)
Mihail Pherekyde (15 December 1909 - 16 February 1910)
Ion I.C. Brătianu (16 February - 28 December 1910)
Minister of Foreign Affairs: 
(interim) Ion I. C. Brătianu (4 March - 1 November 1909)
Alexandru Djuvara (1 November 1909 - 28 December 1910)
Minister of Finance:
Emil Costinescu (4 March 1909 - 28 December 1910)
Minister of Justice:
Toma Stelian (4 March 1909 - 28 December 1910)
Minister of Religious Affairs and Public Instruction:
Spiru Haret (4 March 1909 - 28 December 1910)
Minister of War:
(interim) Toma Stelian (4 March - 1 November 1909)
Gen. Grigore Crăiniceanu (1 November 1909 - 28 December 1910)
Minister of Public Works:
Vasile G. Morțun (4 March 1909 - 28 December 1910)
Minister of Industry and Commerce:
Alexandru Djuvara (4 March - 1 November 1909)
Mihail G. Orleanu (1 November 1909 - 28 December 1910)
Minister of Agriculture and Property:
Anton Carp (4 March - 1 November 1909)
Alexandru Constantinescu (1 November 1909 - 28 December 1910)

References

Cabinets of Romania
Cabinets established in 1909
Cabinets disestablished in 1910
1909 establishments in Romania
1910 disestablishments in Romania